Robel Fsiha (born 7 March 1996) is a Swedish long-distance runner.

Fsiha emigrated from Eritrea to Sweden as a refugee in 2013.

Career

In 2019, he competed in the senior men's race at the 2019 IAAF World Cross Country Championships held in Aarhus, Denmark. He finished in 17th place. In the same year, he won the senior men's race at the 2019 European Cross Country Championships held in Lisbon, Portugal.

He was banned for four years in May 2020 after testing positive for a banned substance. The ban lasts from 5 February 2020 till 4 February 2024.

References

External links 
 

Living people
1996 births
Place of birth missing (living people)
Swedish male long-distance runners
Swedish male cross country runners
Swedish sportspeople in doping cases
Eritrean emigrants to Sweden